Malcom Abdulai Ares Djaló (born 12 October 2001) is a Spanish footballer who plays as a winger for Athletic Bilbao.

Career
Born in Bilbao, Biscay to a Basque mother and father originally from Guinea-Bissau, Ares began his career locally with Danok Bat CF, SD Indautxu and Santutxu FC,  where his talent drew the attention of Athletic Bilbao. Having played one season at senior level with Santutxu he joined the Lions in the summer of 2021, aged 19, and was initially assigned to their farm team, CD Basconia of the Tercera División RFEF (fifth tier).

Ares's good form, as well as a need for reinforcements in the squad of the club's reserve team, Bilbao Athletic – struggling to survive in the 2021–22 Primera División RFEF – saw him promoted mid-season, and he continued to perform impressively at the higher (third) level while helping the team avoid relegation.

In the summer 2022 pre-season, Ares was one of the youth players chosen for training and assessment as part of the Athletic senior squad (along with fellow forward Luis Bilbao and goalkeeper Álex Padilla).  He was listed among the substitutes by coach Ernesto Valverde for the opening day of the 2022–23 La Liga campaign, and made his top division debut as a late replacement for Iñaki Williams in the closing minutes of the fixture against RCD Mallorca at San Mamés, which ended goalless.

Notes

References

External links
 
 
 
 
 
 

 

Living people
2001 births 
Footballers from Bilbao
Spanish people of Bissau-Guinean descent
Spanish sportspeople of African descent
Spanish footballers
Association football wingers
La Liga players
Primera Federación players
Tercera División players
Tercera Federación players
Danok Bat CF players
CD Basconia footballers
Bilbao Athletic footballers
Athletic Bilbao footballers
Santutxu FC players
SD Indautxu footballers